Robert Damon Schneck is an American writer specializing in anomalous phenomena and historical oddities.

A resident of New Jersey, Schneck is the author of The President's Vampire and regular contributor to Fortean Times and Fate. He is director of the White Crow Society, a group that aims to educate and help those who have witnessed or experienced paranormal or other strange phenomena.

A chapter from The President's Vampire was adapted into the screenplay for the horror film The Bye Bye Man, released in January 2017 by Dimension Films/STX.

He is also the author of Mrs. Wakeman vs. The Antichrist, a collection of unusual tales from American history.

Bibliography

Books

The President's Vampire: Strange-but-True Tales of the United States of America, Anomalist Books, paperback, 2005. 
Mrs. Wakeman vs. the Antichrist: And Other Strange-but-True Tales from American History, Tarcher Penguin, paperback, 2014.

Articles
 "Death Had a Sagittal Crest", Fate 52 (2) #587, 1999.
 "You Don't Know Squatch", Fate 52 (4) #589, 1999
 "The God Machine", Fortean Times #158, 2002, about John Murray Spear
 "The President's Vampire", Fortean Times #189, 2004.

References

External links
 Publisher profile
 Blog at the Charles Fort Institute
 Paracast, on which he appeared on January 7, 2007

Year of birth missing (living people)
Living people
American fortean writers
Place of birth missing (living people)
21st-century American male writers
20th-century American male writers
20th-century American non-fiction writers
21st-century American non-fiction writers
American male non-fiction writers